The Dustin Agricultural Building in Dustin, Oklahoma was built as a Works Progress Administration project in 1936.  It is located at Rutherford and Fourth Streets.  It was listed on the National Register of Historic Places in 1988.

It is a one-story  structure made of native sandstone.  It was deemed notable as "an excellent example of an early WPA project where the quarry and mason work are rather crude. It also suggests just how varied were the different projects of the agency. The Dustin facility seems to have been built for no specific purpose and has been used for cotton storage and peanut drying."  When listed it was used by the city for storage of equipment.

References

National Register of Historic Places in Hughes County, Oklahoma
Buildings and structures completed in 1936
Hughes County, Oklahoma